Kim Yong Kap (born January 6, 1919) was the Deputy Minister of Finance of South Korea in 1960.

References 

 객장은 인생수업의 도장, The Dong-a Ilbo, August 29, 1993.

Government ministers of South Korea
Waseda University alumni
1919 births
People from Suncheon
Year of death missing